Parophonus is a genus of beetles in the family Carabidae, containing the following species:

 Parophonus ambiguus (Lecordier, 1982) 
 Parophonus angulatus (Lecordier, 1987) 
 Parophonus angusticollis (Lecordier, 1982) 
 Parophonus antoinei (Schauberger, 1931) 
 Parophonus arbonnieri (Lecordier, 1984) 
 Parophonus axinotomoides (Basilewsky, 1968) 
 Parophonus biseriatus (Lesne, 1896) 
 Parophonus bruneaui (Lecordier, 1984) 
 Parophonus caffer (Boheman, 1848) 
 Parophonus colmanti (Burgeon, 1936) 
 Parophonus compositus (Walker, 1858) 
 Parophonus conspectus (Lecordier, 1987) 
 Parophonus conviva (H.Holbe, 1898) 
 Parophonus cyanellus (Bates, 1889) 
 Parophonus cyaneotinctus (Bates, 1889) 
 Parophonus decellei (Lecordier, 1983) 
 Parophonus dejeani (Csiki, 1932) 
 Parophonus deplanatus (Basilewsky, 1946) 
 Parophonus dia (Reitter, 1900) 
 Parophonus edentatus (Bates, 1892) 
 Parophonus erebius (Bates, 1892) 
 Parophonus escheri (Dejean, 1831) 
 Parophonus formosanus (Jedlicka, 1940) 
 Parophonus fossulatus (Lecordier, 1984) 
 Parophonus girardi (Lecordier, 1982) 
 Parophonus gojebensis (Clarke, 1971) 
 Parophonus gracilis (Andrewes, 1947) 
 Parophonus grandiceps (Bates, 1892) 
 Parophonus hauseri (Schauberger, 1933) 
 Parophonus hespericus Jeanne, 1985 
 Parophonus hiekei (N.Ito, 1993) 
 Parophonus hirsutulus (Dejean, 1829) 
 Parophonus hirsutus (Lecordier, 1987) 
 Parophonus hispanus (Rambur, 1838) 
 Parophonus holosericeus (Dejean, 1829) 
 Parophonus iberiparcus Zaballos & Garcia-Munoz, 1991 
 Parophonus imitativus (Peringuey, 1908) 
 Parophonus indicus (Andrewes, 1931) 
 Parophonus inquinulus (Lecordier, 1984) 
 Parophonus integer (Peringuey, 1896) 
 Parophonus interstitialis (Reitter, 1889) 
 Parophonus iridicolor (Landin, 1955) 
 Parophonus javanus (Gory, 1833) 
 Parophonus juvencus (Dejean, 1829) 
 Parophonus kenyanus Facchini, 2003 
 Parophonus knyi Wrase, 2001 
 Parophonus laeviceps (Menetries, 1832) 
 Parophonus lepidus (Lecordier, 1984) 
 Parophonus lividus (Andrewes, 1923) 
 Parophonus maculicornis (Duftschmid, 1812) 
 Parophonus major (Bates, 1891) 
 Parophonus maniti (N.Ito, 1993) 
 Parophonus marshalli (Barker, 1922) 
 Parophonus mendax (P.Rossi, 1790) 
 Parophonus mirei (Lecordier, 1982) 
 Parophonus moestus (Putzeys In Chaudoir, 1878) 
 Parophonus nagpurensis (N.Ito, 1993) 
 Parophonus nigripes (Burgeon, 1936) 
 Parophonus nossibianus (Brancsik, 1893) 
 Parophonus opacus (W.J.Macleay, 1888) 
 Parophonus optivus (Peringuey, 1908) 
 Parophonus orientalis (Lecordier, 1984) 
 Parophonus ovalipennis (Schauberger, 1932) 
 Parophonus pierroni Jeannel, 1948 
 Parophonus planicollis (Dejean, 1829) 
 Parophonus pseudosericeus (Lecordier, 1982) 
 Parophonus pusillus (Lecordier, 1984) 
 Parophonus quisquilius (Lecordier, 1983) 
 Parophonus rectangulus N.Ito, 1994 
 Parophonus saponarius (Olivier, 1795) 
 Parophonus sericeus (Coquerel, 1866) 
 Parophonus spatulus (Lecordier, 1986) 
 Parophonus spoliatus (Putzeys In Chaudoir, 1876) 
 Parophonus spretus (Lecordier, 1982) 
 Parophonus stricticollis (Lecordier, 1983) 
 Parophonus sublaevis (Bates, 1891) 
 Parophonus substrictus (Lecordier, 1987) 
 Parophonus subtilis (Bates, 1892) 
 Parophonus tibialis (Laferte-Senectere, 1853) 
 Parophonus tomentosus (Dejean, 1829) 
 Parophonus ugandanus (Basilewsky, 1946) 
 Parophonus velutinus (Dejean, 1829) 
 Parophonus vigil Tschitscherine, 1901
 Parophonus vitalisi (Andrewes, 1922)

References

Harpalinae